The following lists events that happened during 1934 in Australia.

Incumbents

Monarch – George V
Governor-General – Sir Isaac Isaacs
Prime Minister – Joseph Lyons
Chief Justice – Frank Gavan Duffy

State Premiers
Premier of New South Wales – Bertram Stevens
Premier of Queensland – William Forgan Smith
Premier of South Australia – Richard L. Butler
Premier of Tasmania – John McPhee (until 15 March), then Walter Lee (until 22 June), then Albert Ogilvie
Premier of Victoria – Sir Stanley Argyle
Premier of Western Australia – Philip Collier

State Governors
Governor of New South Wales – Sir Philip Game
Governor of Queensland – Sir Leslie Orme Wilson
Governor of South Australia – Sir Alexander Hore-Ruthven (until 26 April), then Sir Winston Dugan (from 20 July)
Governor of Tasmania – Sir Ernest Clark
Governor of Victoria – William Vanneck, 5th Baron Huntingfield (from 14 May)
Governor of Western Australia – none appointed

Events

18 January – Qantas and Imperial Airways join forces and establish Qantas Empire Airways.
12 March – An intense cyclone crosses the Queensland coast near Innisfail, 75 people were confirmed dead.
1 September – Body of the "Pyjama Girl" found in Albury, New South Wales.
15 September – A federal election is held. Joseph Lyons is returned as Prime Minister, leading a United Australia Party-Country Party coalition to victory over the Australian Labor Party.
3 October – Qantas de Havilland DH.50 Atalanta, registration VH-UHE, crashes near Winton, Queensland, killing the pilot and 2 passengers.
15 October – Captain Cook's cottage is opened to the public, after being dismantled in England, then shipped to Australia and reassembled in Fitzroy Gardens, Melbourne.
18 October – Charles Prince of Morphettville is found guilty of fraud for the "ring in" of Redlock at the Murray Bridge Racing Club on 28 July.
24 October – C. W. A. Scott and Tom Campbell Black cross the finishing line and win the MacRobertson Air Race, flying from London to Melbourne in an elapsed time of 71 hours.
6 November – The Australian government attempts to stop left-wing writer Egon Erwin Kisch from entering the country, using the language provisions of the Immigration Restriction Act 1901 which allowed a test in any European language. The multi-lingual Kisch was tested in Scottish Gaelic, although the decision to block his entry was later overturned by the High Court.
11 November – The Shrine of Remembrance in Melbourne is dedicated.
15 November – Qantas de Havilland DH86 crashes after departing from Longreach Airport during its delivery flight.

Unknown dates
 The first ute is produced by Ford in Geelong
 CMV Group founded

Arts and literature

 Henry Hanke wins the Archibald Prize with his self-portrait
 Eleanor Dark's Prelude to Christopher is published. The author was later awarded the ALS Gold Medal.
 Martin Boyd publishes his first novel Scandal of Spring
 Christina Stead publishes her first novel Seven Poor Men of Sydney

Film
 Strike Me Lucky, starring Roy Rene and directed by Ken G. Hall, is released

Sport
8 September - The 1934 NSWRFL season culminates in Western Suburbs' 15–12 victory against Eastern Suburbs in the final. University finish in last place, claiming the wooden spoon.
 Peter Pan wins the Melbourne Cup
 Victoria wins the Sheffield Shield
 Australia defeats England 2–1 in The Ashes series, held in England

Births
6 January – Harry M. Miller, promoter and publicist (died 2018)
11 January – Peter Badcoe, soldier and Victoria Cross recipient (died 1967)
20 January – Barry Fisher, cricketer (died 1980)
26 January – Ruby Langford Ginibi, Indigenous author and historian (died 2011)
31 January – Gil Jamieson, painter (died 1992)
15 February – Graham Kennedy, entertainer (died 2005)
17 February – Barry Humphries, entertainer
24 February – Frank Brazier, Olympic cyclist (died 2021)
20 March – David Malouf, writer
16 April – Barrie Unsworth, Premier of New South Wales
27 April – Colin Holt, Australian rules footballer (died 2018)
1 May – John Meillon, actor (died 1989)
5 May – Victor Garland, politician and high commissioner to the UK (died 2022)
6 May – Chris Wallace-Crabbe, poet and academic
2 June – Ian Brooker, botanist (died 2016)
27 June – Bill Hay, Australian rules footballer (died 2018)
6 July – Tony Burreket, politician
7 July – Brian Davis, politician (died 2018)
11 July – Barney Cooney, politician (died 2019)
16 July – Marjorie McQuade, swimmer
18 July – Alan Ridge, politician
12 August – Ian George, Anglican Archbishop of Adelaide (1991–2004)(died 2019)
17 August – Ben Humphreys, politician (died 2019)
25 August – Jimmy Hannan, television presenter (died 2019)
15 September – Fred Nile, clergyman and politician
9 October – Jill Ker Conway, author and academic (died 2018)
10 October – Julian Beale, politician (died 2021)
24 October – Margie Masters, golfer (died 2022)
2 November – Ken Rosewall, tennis player
16 November – Peter Ross Sinclair, Governor of New South Wales (1990–1996)
4 December – Bill Collins, film critic (died 2019)
24 December – Alan Beaumont, Chief of the Australian Defence Force (1993–1995), (died 2004)

Deaths

 1 January – Sir Robert Gibson, businessman (born in the United Kingdom) (b. 1863)
 14 January – Staniforth Smith, Western Australian politician (b. 1869)
 22 January – Arthur Jose, historian (born in the United Kingdom) (b. 1863)
 30 January – Edward Heitmann, Western Australian politician (b. 1878)
 21 February – Sydney Smith, New South Wales politician (b. 1856)
 27 February – George Temple-Poole, architect and public servant (born in Italy) (b. 1856)
 17 March – Walter Rosenhain, metallurgist (born in Germany and died in the United Kingdom) (b. 1875)
 23 March – Thomas Brown, New South Wales politician (b. 1861)
 29 March – Sir Josiah Symon, South Australian politician (born in the United Kingdom) (b. 1846)
 30 March – Ronald Munro Ferguson, 1st Viscount Novar, 6th Governor-General of Australia (born and died in the United Kingdom) (b. 1860)
 12 April – Bertram Steele, scientist (born in the United Kingdom) (b. 1870)
 12 May – Agar Wynne, Victorian politician (born in the United Kingdom) (b. 1850)
 25 May – Percy Coleman, New South Wales politician and union organiser (b. 1892)
 5 June - Emily Dobson, philanthropist (b. 1842)
 6 June – William Holman, 19th Premier of New South Wales (born in the United Kingdom) (b. 1871)
 19 June – John McDonald, Western Australian politician (b. 1869)
 30 June – David Charleston, South Australian politician (born in the United Kingdom) (b. 1848)
 14 July – John Thomson, New South Wales politician (b. 1862)
 31 July – Charles McGrath, Victorian politician (b. 1872)
 6 August – Alexander Leeper, educationist (born in Ireland) (b. 1848)
 18 August – Sir John Sulman, architect (born in the United Kingdom) (b. 1949)
 27 August – Linda Agostini, murder victim (born in the United Kingdom) (b. 1905)
 28 August – Sir Edgeworth David, geologist and explorer (born in the United Kingdom) (b. 1858)
 5 September – Sidney Myer, businessman and philanthropist (born in Belarus) (b. 1878)
 10 September – Fred Bamford, Queensland politician (b. 1849)
 7 October – William Sutherland Dun, palaeontologist and geologist (born in the United Kingdom) (b. 1868)
 16 October – James Mathews, Victorian politician (b. 1865)
 21 November – John Scaddan, 10th Premier of Western Australia (b. 1876)
 3 December – Charles Ulm, aviator (died in the Pacific Ocean) (b. 1898)

See also
 List of Australian films of the 1930s

References

External links

 
Australia
Years of the 20th century in Australia